Edward Mrkvicka is a lay minister and nationally known financial expert. He is the author of many award-winning books, and CEO of Reliance Enterprises, Inc., Marengo, IL.

Life and career
He was born (1944) and raised in Downers Grove, IL.

He was on active military service in the United States Air Force from 1965 to 1969 and honorably discharged October 1971.

His education was:
University of Illinois Institute of Aviation (Graduated 1964),
Department of Defense Information School (Graduated 1967),
School of Bank Marketing/University of Colorado (Graduated 1972), and
Graduate School of Bank Marketing (Graduated 1973).

In 1976 he was the youngest chairman of the board and national bank president in America. He is a former columnist; member of the Panel of Experts for Boardroom Reports; and SEC registered investment adviser.
He has been featured or published in virtually every major newspaper and magazine, including USA Today, Boston Globe, Chicago Tribune, Family Circle, Cosmopolitan, and Nation’s Business, as well as appearing on over 600 syndicated talk shows.
His writing focus lately has been dedicated to his religious beliefs and Christian counseling efforts - specifically, the destruction of the family, adultery, divorce, and their impact on innocent children.

He was awarded a U.S. Certificate of Special Congressional Recognition “…in recognition of outstanding and invaluable service to the community.”

Works
His financial books on personal finance, banking, and the stock market have been selected by numerous book clubs, as well as being required reading at colleges and universities.

His Christian books have been honored with a Best Christian Book of the Year Award, a Best Christian Study Award, named a National Book Award finalist, and a winner in The Christian Choice Book Awards.

Published works
 The Prayer Promise of Christ (2010)
 “Be Not Deceived” (2007)
 Pick Winning Stocks (2000)
 Your Bank is Ripping You Off (1997, 1999)
 The Bank Book (1989, 1991, 1994)
 The Rational Investor (1991)
 1,037 Ways to Make or Save Up to $100,000 This Year Alone (1991)
 Moving Up (1986)
 Battle Your Bank - and Win! (1985)

References

External links
Official site

Living people
American businesspeople
Year of birth missing (living people)